Coleophora alticorollina is a moth of the family Coleophoridae. It is found in China.

References

alticorollina
Moths of Asia
Moths described in 1999